Antidesma montanum is a species of tree in the family Phyllanthaceae, native to Southeast Asia, from India to the Philippines. The fruits are edible. Four varieties have been accepted, each of which has multiple synonyms, which include Antidesma obliquinervium for A. montanum var. montanum.

Taxonomy
Antidesma montanum was first described by Carl Ludwig Blume in 1827.

Varieties
, Plants of the World Online listed four varieties:
Antidesma montanum var. microphyllum (Hemsl.) Petra Hoffm.
Antidesma montanum var. montanum
Antidesma montanum var. salicinum (Ridl.) Petra Hoffm.
Antidesma montanum var. wallichii (Tul.) Petra Hoffm.

The varieties each have multiple synonyms. , Antidesma obliquinervium was accepted by Plants of the World Online as a synonym of A. montanum var. montanum. The 1998 IUCN Red List treated A. obliquinervium as "vulnerable", describing it as endemic to Palawan in the Philippines, while A. montanum var. montanum has a wide distribution similar to that of the species as a whole.

See also
Antidesma bunius

References

External links
 Details
 http://www.efloras.org/florataxon.aspx?flora_id=2&taxon_id=242303585

montanum
Plants described in 1826